Instant Marriage is a musical with music by Laurie Holloway and words by Bob Grant.

It premiered at the Piccadilly Theatre in London on 1 August 1964, playing for 366 performances. The cast featured Joan Sims, Paul Whitsun-Jones, Bob Grant, Stephanie Voss, Rex Garner, Harold Goodwin and Wallas Eaton.

There was an Australian production in 1965, playing at the Tivoli Theatre in each of Melbourne and Sydney.

References

1964 musicals
British musicals
West End musicals